Bergensdalen is a valley in Bergen in Vestland county, Norway. It is surrounded by the Ulriken, Landås, Løvstakken and Nattlands mountains.

Valleys of Vestland